UFC Fight Night: dos Santos vs. Ivanov  (also known as UFC Fight Night 133) was a mixed martial arts event produced by the Ultimate Fighting Championship that was held on July 14, 2018 at CenturyLink Arena in Boise, Idaho, United States.

Background 
The event marked the promotion's first visit to Idaho.

A heavyweight bout between former UFC Heavyweight Champion Junior dos Santos and former WSOF Heavyweight Champion Blagoy Ivanov served as the event headliner.

A strawweight bout between former WSOF Women's Strawweight Champion Jessica Aguilar and Jodie Esquibel was originally expected to take place at UFC Fight Night: Rivera vs. Moraes. However the bout was removed from the card the day of the event by the NYSAC due to a concern over a medical issue with Aguilar. The pairing was rescheduled for this event.

James Vick was expected to face Paul Felder at the event. However, on June 27, Vick was pulled from the bout to act as a replacement against former WSOF Lightweight Champion Justin Gaethje at UFC Fight Night: Gaethje vs. Vick. In turn, Felder was moved to a welterweight bout against Mike Perry at UFC 226.

Results

Bonus awards
The following fighters earned $50,000 bonuses:
Fight of the Night: Raoni Barcelos vs. Kurt Holobaugh
Performance of the Night: Niko Price and Chad Mendes

See also
List of UFC events
2018 in UFC
List of current UFC fighters

References

UFC Fight Night
2018 in mixed martial arts
Mixed martial arts in Idaho
Sports in Boise, Idaho
2018 in sports in Idaho
July 2018 sports events in the United States